The Cuatro Vientos was a specially built Br.19 TF Super Bidon, which Mariano Barberán y Tros de Ilarduya, Lieutenant Joaquín Collar Serra and Sergeant Modesto Madariaga flew from Spain to Cuba in 1933.

On 20 June 1933, the aircraft departed for Mexico City, without Madariaga on board. It disappeared in flight, and was last sighted in the vicinity of Villahermosa, Mexico. No trace of the plane or of its occupants was subsequently found.

A replica of the Cuatro Vientos is housed at the Museo del Aire.

References

1933 in Cuba
1933 in Mexico
1933 in Spain
Missing aircraft